Tammy West (born May 24, 1959) is an American politician who has served in the Oklahoma House of Representatives from the 84th district since 2016.

References

1959 births
Living people
Republican Party members of the Oklahoma House of Representatives
21st-century American politicians
21st-century American women politicians
Women state legislators in Oklahoma